The Global Water Policy Project (GWPP) was founded by Sandra Postel in 1994. Its aim is to promote the preservation of Earth's freshwater through research, writing, outreach and public speaking.

The GWPP is based in New Mexico, in the southwestern United States.

See also 

:Category:Water resource policy
Sustainability
Biodiversity
Global warming
Ecology
Earth Science
Natural environment

References

External links
Global Water Policy Project—Official website

1994 establishments in Massachusetts
Environmental organizations based in the United States
Water resource policy
Organizations established in 1994